Karl Hopf may refer to:
 Karl Hopf (historian)
 Karl Hopf (serial killer)